"Bad Blood" is a single originally released by Siobhan Fahey under her own name. It was released in October 2005, and failed to chart. Since its inclusion on Fahey's band Shakespears Sister's fourth studio album Songs from the Red Room, it is considered a song by Shakespears Sister, and the third single from said album.

Track listing 
CD single
"Bad Blood" — 4:18
"Bad Blood" (Alan Moulder Mix) — 4:11
"Bad Blood" (Jagz Kooner Mix) — 6:04

Digital download
"Bad Blood" (Album Version) — 4:26
"Bad Blood" (GHP Remix)  — 4:34
"Bad Blood" (Alan Moulder Remix) — 4:16
"Bad Blood" (The Most Mix) — 7:16

References 

2005 singles
British pop songs
Shakespears Sister songs
Songs written by Siobhan Fahey
2005 songs